Trinity Catholic High School is a Roman Catholic college preparatory day school in Ocala, Florida. Located in the Diocese of Orlando, Trinity Catholic is the first and only Catholic high school in Ocala.

Trinity Catholic High School was founded in 2000 by the Diocese of Orlando. The founding Principal was Br. Thomas Andrew Prendergast.

There were approximately 50 students which comprised the 9th grade and the school was conducted in a wing of classrooms in Blessed Trinity School, Ocala. In its second year, the 9th and 10th grades were held in portable classrooms on the actual site on which the school was being built.

As of the 2021-2022 school year, the institute serves 529 students from grades 9-12.

Notable alumni
Antonio Allen, American football free safety for the New York Jets of the National Football League (NFL).
Brittany Bowe, American speed skater, olympian.
John Brantley, college football player.
Rob Henry, football player
Geron Christian (American football) plays for the Washington Redskins.
Kadron Boone (American football) New York Giants.
Ulysees Gilbert III (American football) Pittsburgh Steelers.

Sports
Trinity Catholic won the FHSAA  Football State Championship in 2005 and 2010. 
Trinity Catholic's girls' soccer team won the FHSAA Soccer State Championship in 2013.
In 2011 Quincy Hoppel won the FHSAA 1A 145lb State Championship in wrestling. In 2017, the track team won the FHSAA 2A Girls State Championship in Adapted Track & Field. On May 4, 2018, Jordan Lewis won a state championship in the Boys 110m Hurdles. On November 15, 2018, the volleyball team won the FHSAA 5A State Championship. baseball won states in 2014

Notes and references

External links

 School website
 Facebook Page
 MaxPreps Sports Page

Congregation of Christian Brothers secondary schools
Catholic secondary schools in Florida
Educational institutions established in 2000
High schools in Marion County, Florida
Education in Marion County, Florida
2000 establishments in Florida